Michałówka  is a village in the administrative district of Gmina Parczew, within Parczew County, Lublin Voivodeship, in eastern Poland.

In 2005 the village had a population of 850.

References

Villages in Parczew County